Ivan Gennadievich Iakovlev (born 17 April 1995) is a Russian volleyball player. He is part of the Russia men's national volleyball team. On club level, he plays for Russian club Zenit Saint Petersburg.

Sporting achievements

Clubs
 CEV Cup
  2020/2021 – with Zenit Saint Petersburg

 CEV Challenge Cup
  2015/2016 – with Fakel Novy Urengoy
  2016/2017 – with Fakel Novy Urengoy

Youth national team
 2017  FIVB U23 World Championship

National team
 2019  FIVB Nations League
 2021  Olympic Games

Individual awards
 2017: FIVB U23 World Championship – Best Middle Blocker
 2019: FIVB Nations League – Best Middle Blocker
 2021: Olympic Games Tokyo – Best Middle Blocker

References

External links
 Player profile at CEV.eu
 Player profile at WorldofVolley.com
 Player profile at Volleybox.net

1995 births
Living people
Sportspeople from Saint Petersburg
Russian men's volleyball players
Volleyball players at the 2020 Summer Olympics
Olympic volleyball players of Russia
Medalists at the 2020 Summer Olympics
Olympic silver medalists for the Russian Olympic Committee athletes
Olympic medalists in volleyball
VC Zenit Saint Petersburg players
Middle blockers